Charnay is a commune in the Rhône department in eastern France.

The village is part of the Beaujolais wine region and is home to numerous wineries. It is also regionally famous for its authentic medieval village.

Gallery

See also
Communes of the Rhône department

References

Communes of Rhône (department)